Ja'Marr Anthony Chase (born March 1, 2000) is an American football wide receiver for the Cincinnati Bengals of the National Football League (NFL). He played college football at LSU, where he won the Fred Biletnikoff Award and the 2020 College Football Playoff National Championship as a sophomore. Selected fifth overall by the Bengals in the 2021 NFL Draft, Chase was named the NFL Offensive Rookie of the Year and a second-team All-Pro after setting rookie records for single-year and single-game receiving yards en route to an appearance in Super Bowl LVI.

Early years
Chase attended Archbishop Rummel High School in Metairie, Louisiana, located in suburban New Orleans. During his career, he had 115 receptions for 2,152 yards and 30 touchdowns. Coming out of high school, Chase was a 4 star recruit ranked the nations 84th overall recruit and number 15 receiver prospect. After initially committing to the University of Kansas, Chase committed to Louisiana State University (LSU) to play college football.

College career

As a true freshman at LSU in 2018, Chase played in all 14 games and made eight starts. He finished the season with 23 receptions for 313 yards and three touchdowns.

Chase returned as a starter in 2019, and that year led the FBS in receiving yards with 1,780 yards on 84 catches (21.2 avg) and 20 receiving touchdowns. His 20 receiving touchdowns set a Southeastern Conference (SEC) record until it was broken by DeVonta Smith the following year. Six times he eclipsed the 100-yard mark and an additional three times he eclipsed 200 receiving yards in a game mark, including a College Football Playoff championship game record 221 yards against Clemson.  LSU finished the year undefeated and won the College Football Playoff National Championship. At the end of the regular season, Chase was awarded the Fred Biletnikoff Award as the best receiver in college football. He was also named a unanimous All-American.

A month before the start of the 2020 season, Chase announced that he was opting out to concentrate on his NFL career. His decision was reportedly not specifically due to the COVID-19 pandemic at the time, but rather due to agents having convinced him to sit out his third collegiate season so to not get injured. Chase was assured he would be a top draft pick before the season started. NFL rules state a player can not be drafted until three years after leaving high school.

College statistics

Professional career

Chase was drafted by the Cincinnati Bengals fifth overall in the 2021 NFL Draft, reuniting him with his college quarterback Joe Burrow. He became the first player in franchise history to wear the number 1, which was his number in college. Chase signed his four-year rookie contract, worth $30.8 million, on June 2, 2021.

2021

Despite early struggles in the preseason, Chase played his first career regular season game on September 12, 2021, against the Minnesota Vikings, finishing with 101 receiving yards and a touchdown as the Bengals won 27–24 in overtime. Chase caught an additional three touchdown passes over his next two games, making him the youngest player in NFL history to catch four touchdown passes in his first three career games. Chase was named the NFL Rookie of the Month for September after totaling 220 receiving yards and four touchdowns through his first three games.

During the Bengals 25–22 overtime loss to the Green Bay Packers, Chase had 159 yards, including a 70-yard touchdown at the end of the first half, earning him another Rookie of the Week award. During Week 7 against the Baltimore Ravens, Chase finished with 201 receiving yards, including an 82-yard touchdown in the Bengals 41–17 win, earning him his first AFC Offensive Player of the Week award. His 754 receiving yards set an NFL record for the most receiving yards ever by a player in their first seven career games. On December 22, Chase was announced as a selection for the 2022 Pro Bowl.

In Week 17 against the Kansas City Chiefs, Chase totaled 266 receiving yards and three touchdowns during the Bengals' 34–31 division clinching win. He was named AFC offensive player of the week, his second of the season. Chase's 266 yards not only set a Bengals franchise record for receiving yards, but it also set an NFL record for most receiving yards in a game by a rookie. In Week 18 against the Cleveland Browns, Chase caught two passes for 26 yards before leaving the game, surpassing the Bengals franchise record set by Chad Johnson for most receiving yards in a single season. Overall, Chase finished his rookie regular season with 81 receptions for 1,455 yards (4th in the NFL) and 13 receiving touchdowns (3rd). He was named Offensive Rookie of the Year by the Associated Press and the PFWA. He was named the Sporting News Rookie of the Year as well.

In the Wild Card Game against the Las Vegas Raiders, Chase had nine receptions for 116 receiving yards and three carries for 23 yards, helping the Bengals win their first playoff game since the 1990 season. In the Divisional Round against the Tennessee Titans, Chase recorded five receptions for 109 receiving yards, making him the youngest player in NFL history to record multiple 100 yard receiving games in a single postseason. In the AFC Championship Game, Chase caught 6 passes for 54 yards and a touchdown in the 27–24 overtime win against the Kansas City Chiefs, helping the Bengals advance to Super Bowl LVI, their first Super Bowl appearance since Super Bowl XXIII in 1988. In the Super Bowl, Chase caught 5 passes for 89 yards, but lost 23–20. Chase's 368 postseason receiving yards set a rookie record, breaking the previous record of 242 set by Torry Holt in the 1999 season. He was ranked 24th by his fellow players of the NFL Top 100 Players of 2022.

2022

In Week 1 against the Pittsburgh Steelers, Chase caught 10 passes for 129 yards and a game-tying touchdown with no time left in regulation, in the 23–20 overtime loss. In Week 6, Chase suffered a hip injury in the game, but he had 7 receptions for 132 yards and two second-half touchdowns in a 30–26 comeback victory against the New Orleans Saints.  He ended up missing four games from the injury, but still finished the season as the team's leader in receptions (87) and receiving yards (1,046), and was still selected to the Pro Bowl for the second consecutive year. In the Bengals' Wild Card Round playoff win over the Baltimore Ravens, he was the game's leading receiver with nine receptions for 84 yards and a touchdown. In the Divisional Round game against the Buffalo Bills, Chase caught 5 passes for 61 yards and a touchdown in the 27–10 victory  He added 6 receptions for 75 yards in their AFC championship loss to the Kansas City Chiefs.

NFL career statistics

Regular season

Postseason

Records and achievements

NFL Records
 Receiving yards in a season including postseason by a rookie (1,823, 2021)
 Youngest NFL player with multiple 100 yard receiving games in a single postseason (2021)
 Receiving yards in a game by a rookie (266, 2021)
 Receiving yards in a postseason by a rookie (368, 2021)

Bengals franchise records
 Receiving yards in a game (266, 2021)
 Receiving yards in a season (1,455, 2021)

References

External links

Cincinnati Bengals bio
LSU Tigers bio

2000 births
Living people
21st-century African-American sportspeople
African-American players of American football
All-American college football players
American Conference Pro Bowl players
American football wide receivers
Archbishop Rummel High School alumni
Cincinnati Bengals players
People from Harvey, Louisiana
Players of American football from New Orleans
LSU Tigers football players